Viktor Andriyovych (or Andreyevich) Lysenko (born 1947 in Mykolaiv; died 27 July 2003 in Mykolaiv) was a Soviet football player.

International career
Lysenko played his only game for USSR on 20 February 1969 in a friendly against Colombia.

External links
  Profile

1947 births
2003 deaths
Sportspeople from Mykolaiv
Soviet footballers
Soviet Union international footballers
FC Chornomorets Odesa players
Ukrainian footballers
Association football defenders
Soviet Top League players